Vigil India Movement (Vigil India) is a non-governmental organisation based in Bangalore working in the field of human rights in India. Founded in 1977, by Rev. Dr. M.A. Thomas, who also founded the Ecumenical Christian Centre in Bangalore in 1963 and Association of Christian Institutes for Social Concern in Asia.

In 1998, Vigil India launched The Institute of Human Rights with Mr. Justice M.N. Venkatachaliah, former Chief Justice of India and former Chairman of the National Human Rights Commission. The Institute is a training programme for human rights activists, "training trainers" for grass roots education in human rights.

The organisation awards the Rev. M.A. Thomas National Human Rights Award  annually.

The recipients since 1993 include:
 Lenin Raghuvanshi, 2016
 Jayamma Bandari, 2014
 Swami Agnivesh, 2006
 Teesta Setalvad, 2004 
 Harsh Mander, 2002
 Medha Patkar, 1999
 Justice V. R. Krishna Iyer, 1998
 Ravi Nair, 1997

References

External links
 Vigil India Movement

Non-profit organisations based in India
Human rights organisations based in India
Organizations established in 1977
1977 establishments in India